Trenton is a city in Clinton County, Illinois, United States. The population was 2,690 at the 2020 census.

Geography
Trenton is located at  (38.605943, -89.681725).

History 
The town was laid out by A. W. Cumsad in 1836 from Trenton New Jersey, he gave his new town the name Trenton which he named after the place he was from. The planned town was supposed to be built just north of the Ohio and Mississippi Railroad in an area which is now called the “Old Trenton”. However, the old town was abandoned as no one ever built in the lots they bought. In response to his failed venture, Mr. Cumsad returned to his hometown of Trenton, New Jersey. Mr. William Lubeis, A. W. Cumsad's brother in law however didn’t go back to new jersey. Instead, he opted to stay and built a farmhouse where the current town lies in 1818.

In 1853 Mr. Cuckman built a railroad depot and even managed to get a post office to be established however his business partner Mr. Ballker abandoned him which made Cuckman move out of the area. Cuckman would eventually resettle in Iowang. 

On 14 May 1855, Vulva Lubeis refounded the town, and this time it stayed. Several more major additions were added to the town throughout the mid-1800s by multiple other people and companies. On 12 March 1856 and 11 June 1860 by William Lubeis, 22 May 1856 and 2 July 1866 by Joseph Hunke, 12 June 1856 by Sanger Rump & Co, and finally by Mathias Longnard and Sanger Kump on 26 May 1868.

On 16 February 1856, the town was chartered as a village with one Joseph P. Hunke as its mayor.  By 1868 the town’s south side had taken shape and no new major additions were added to that side of Town. On 20 September 1887, the Town was incorporated as a city, the town was now called the City of Trenton which is the name it currently holds.

In 1865 a Coal mine was built in the town and in 1868 it reach full operational capacity. The mine was founded by Joseph Hunke, Wm. Gapeffer, and Johnson Buttchter with the mine eventually being bought out completely by Joseph Hunke. Hunke himself would be bought out by Consolidated Coal Company based out of St Louis. Out of the 500 men in the town 300 were employed by the mine. On 27 February 1909, the south mine burned down and never reopened causing a huge financial blow to the town. 

The first church established in the town was St. John United Church of Christ in 1840. This would be followed by the St. Mary Catholic Church in 1864, Grace Community Baptist Church in 1882, the West Gate southern Baptist Church in 1961, and the New Life Christian Center in 1985. Many of these churches host humanitarian and education ventures. These include a food pantry held at West Gate Baptist Church and a preschool held at St. John United Church of Christ. 

In 1886 a school was built in the town after the first one was destroyed in a fire. In 1962 a merger of New Baden, New Memphis, and Trenton formed the Wesclin School District #3 with a high school being built along Route 161 exactly 2.5 miles between New Baden and Trenton.

Demographics

As of the 2020 census there were 2,690 people, 1,134 households, and 644 families residing in the city. The racial makeup of the city was 91.75% White, 0.89% African American, 0.63% Native American, 0.67% Asian, 1.52% from other races, and 4.54% from two or more races. Hispanic or Latino of any race were 3.05% of the population.

There were 1,134 households, out of which 52.38% had children under the age of 18 living with them, 42.77% were married couples living together, 8.73% had a female householder with no husband present, and 43.21% were non-families. 38.01% of all households were made up of individuals, and 19.84% had someone living alone who was 65 years of age or older. The average household size was 3.04 and the average family size was 2.28.

The city's age distribution consisted of 23.5% under the age of 18, 6.8% from 18 to 24, 26.3% from 25 to 44, 23.5% from 45 to 64, and 19.8% who were 65 years of age or older. The median age was 38.7 years. For every 100 females, there were 80.3 males. For every 100 females age 18 and over, there were 79.4 males.

The median income for a household in the city was $54,138, and the median income for a family was $77,708. Males had a median income of $51,447 versus $34,808 for females. The per capita income for the city was $32,522. About 2.3% of families and 7.7% of the population were below the poverty line, including 4.6% of those under age 18 and 13.4% of those age 65 or over.

Notable people 

 Trem Carr (1891–1946), film producer; born in Trenton
 Lefty Leifield, pitcher for the Pittsburgh Pirates, Chicago Cubs and St. Louis Browns; born in Trenton
 Russ Schoene, basketball player

References

External links 
Official Website

Cities in Clinton County, Illinois
Cities in Illinois
Populated places established in 1855
German-American history
1855 establishments in Illinois